Dendropsophus grandisonae is a species of frog in the family Hylidae.
It is endemic to Guyana.
Its natural habitats are subtropical or tropical moist lowland forests, rivers, freshwater marshes, and intermittent freshwater marshes.

References

Sources

grandisonae
Endemic fauna of Guyana
Amphibians of Guyana
Amphibians described in 1966
Taxonomy articles created by Polbot